George Albert Bazaine-Hayter (4 December 1843 – 30 January 1914), known as Albert, was a French general.

Early life 

Bazaine-Hayter was the son of Pierre-Dominique (Adolphe) Bazaine and nephew of François Achille Bazaine, on whose General Staff he served in the French intervention in Mexico and during the Franco-Prussian War.

Military service 

Bazaine-Hayter engaged as a volunteer on July 19, 1862 in the 34th infantry regiment. When war was declared in 1870, he was appointed orderly officer of the Marshal commanding the 3rd corps of the Army of the Rhine. He attended all the battles fought under Metz.

When describing the French position in the Franco-Prussian War, in particular, the shortomings of the military organisation; incoherence of the first operations; and the incompetence of command, which were described as a "harbinger of inevitable disasters", Bazaine-Hayter stated "We had no preparation: no horses to haul the artillery reserves and the bridge equipment, no tools to dig the trenches; our machine guns arrived directly from the factories and those using them were not properly trained in their use; our artillery was inferior in number, in effectiveness and in reach, in summary, we were powerless against the Prussian artillery.  Our battle formations, already old in 1859, were old-fashioned and stuck in a rut; our procedures and regulations had not been reviewed for over 30 years; our orders, brave beyond doubt, were ignorant, without doctrine and without initiative. These were the causes of our defeats, of all our defeats".

He was taken prisoner on 29 October 1870, but eventually returned to France on 15 March 1871. After a short period of redundancy on 23 July 1871, he started back into militrary service on 11 November 1871.

Despite France's loss and his familial connection with François Achille Bazaine, who was eventually convicted of treason for his role in the Franco-Prussian War, Bazaine-Hayter had a successful military career of his own.

Bazaine-Hayter progress through a variety of military ranks:-

Bazaine-Hayter was assigned to a number of militrary postings:-

He was also an early critic of the lack of effective French military preparation to counter the increasing threat posed to France by the German Empire. He was one of the early pioneers of military aviation and a keen supporter of the Wright brothers when they visited Camp d'Auvours, Le Mans in 1908.

Placed in the reserve section on December 4, 1908, at the end of a successful career.

Personal life 

He adopted his mother's maiden name Hayter as part of his surname in recognition of the support the Hayters gave to his unfortunate uncle, Marshal Bazaine, in escaping from his prison on Île Sainte-Marguerite and in his later life in exile.

Awards 

By decree on 9 September 1870, Bazaine-Hayter was awarded a Knight in France's Legion of Honour. This Legion of Honour rank was upgraded by decree on 4 May 1889 to that of Officier, and then again upgraded by decree on 3 September 1903 to Commander. He was ultimately awarded the title of Grand Officier by decree on 30 December 1908

Works

He co-wrote a number of works on infantry tactics and the use of attacking tactics in infantry doctrine:-

Quotes
"Firepower does not weaken the offensive. Never forget that defensive battle will seldom bring victory. However powerful weapons become, the victory will go to the offensive which stimulates moral forces, disconcerts the enemy and deprives him of his freedom of action"

Death 

Bazaine-Hayter died on 30 January 1914 in Morcote (Switzerland).

See also
 Legion of Honour
 Legion of Honour Museum
 List of Legion of Honour recipients by name (B)
 Ribbons of the French military and civil awards

 War Cross (France)

References

1843 births
1914 deaths
People from Amiens
French military personnel of the Franco-Prussian War
Grand Officiers of the Légion d'honneur
French generals
French military writers
French male non-fiction writers